Group A of the 2007 FIFA Women's World Cup was one of four groups of nations competing at the 2007 FIFA Women's World Cup. The group's first round of matches began on September 10 and its last matches were played on September 17. Most matches were played at the Hongkou Stadium in Shanghai. Defending champions Germany topped the group, joined in the second round by England, the only team Germany failed to beat.

Standings

Matches
All times are local (UTC+8)

Germany vs Argentina

Japan vs England

Argentina vs Japan

England vs Germany

Germany vs Japan

England vs Argentina

Notes

References 

Group
Group
Group
Group
2007–08 in Argentine football